In 2012, there were about six hundred Filipinos in Uganda.  The leader of the community was Divina Mikkelsen and they were represented diplomatically by the consul in neighbouring Kenya, Donna Celeste Feliciano Gatmaytan.

See also
Foreign relations of the Philippines

References

Uganda
Ugandan people by ethnic or national origin